Nebria christinae is a species of black coloured ground beetle from Nebriinae family that is endemic to Nepal.

References

christinae
Beetles described in 2007
Beetles of Asia
Endemic fauna of Nepal